Joseph G. Crane was a Union Army officer who was appointed mayor of Jackson, Mississippi (the state capitol) in 1869. He was stabbed to death on the capitol steps by Edward M. Yerger, a former Confederate Army officer who edited a newspaper. After military officials arrested his assailant, a writ of Habeas corpus was filed and eventually appealed to the U.S. Supreme Court in Ex parte Yerger. After it ruled, a deal was made and he was released to civil authorities, bonded out, and moved to Baltimore, Maryland. He was never tried.

Crane was a breveted colonel. He was killed June 8, 1869. Yerger was represented by his uncle William Yerger who had served on the Mississippi Supreme Court in the 1850s.

Under Crane’s authority a piano was seized from Yerger’s family to satisfy a tax assessment. Yerger owned and edited the Evening Journal in Baltimore.

See also
List of mayors of Jackson, Mississippi

Further reading
 The Tragedy of Tuesday, June 8; The Killing of Col. Joseph G. Crane, Mayor of the City of Jackson, Miss., by Edward M. Yerger (1869)

References

Year of birth missing
Assassinated American politicians
Mayors of Jackson, Mississippi
1869 murders in the United States
Union Army colonels
19th-century American politicians
Assassinated American county and local politicians